Amos Dairies Uganda Limited, also Amos Dairies, is a dairy processing company in Uganda. It is a subsidiary of Amos Dairies Limited, an Indian company with headquarters in New Delhi, India.

Location
The head office and factory of Amos Dairies Uganda Limited are located in the town called Akageti, in Kiruhura District, in the Ankole sub-region of the  Western Region of Uganda.

Overview
The factory, which took approximately 18 months to construct, cost about US$22 million (about USh55.8 billion, at that time). Beginning with capacity of 400,000 liters per day. It was expected that production would gradually be increased to 2 million liters daily. Most of the products that this factory puts out are exported to various regions of the world, including the United States of America. The local farmers in the district and sub-region are expected to benefit from the ready market for their milk at competitive prices.

Operations
Amos Dairies Uganda Limited purchases raw milk from 7,000 to 10,000 smallholder farmers in the community, through cooperative societies and middlemen. The milk is processed into  Anhydrous milk fat, Butter, Ghee, Casein and Whey. The factory products are exported, to earn the country valuable foreign exchange. In February 2020, Amos Diaries began to purchase raw milk from Kabula Farmers’ Cooperative Society, in Lyantonde District, the district to the immediate east of Kiruhura District, where the factory is located.

See also
List of milk processing companies in Uganda
Dairy industry in Uganda

References

External links
 President meets Amos Dairies, Investors to open plant processing over 2 million litres per year As of 13 May 2014.
 Opportunities and challenges in Uganda’s dairy industry

 Dairy products companies of Uganda
Companies established in 2014
2014 establishments in Uganda
Food and drink companies established in 2014
Kiruhura District
Ankole sub-region
Western Region, Uganda